Patton Village is a census-designated place in Lassen County, California. It lies at an elevation of 4111 feet (1253 m). Its population is 632 as of the 2020 census, down from 702 from the 2010 census.

Geography
According to the United States Census Bureau, the CDP has a total area of 3.3 square miles (8.6 km), all of which is land.

Demographics
At the 2010 census Patton Village had a population of 702. The racial makeup of Patton Village was 552 (78.6%) White, 48 (6.8%) African American, 27 (3.8%) Native American, 4 (0.6%) Asian, 5 (0.7%) Pacific Islander, 18 (2.6%) from other races, and 48 (6.8%) from two or more races. Hispanic or Latino of any race were 62 people (8.8%).

The whole population lived in households, no one lived in non-institutionalized group quarters and no one was institutionalized.

There were 289 households, 80 (27.7%) had children under the age of 18 living in them, 134 (46.4%) were opposite-sex married couples living together, 44 (15.2%) had a female householder with no husband present, 22 (7.6%) had a male householder with no wife present.  There were 24 (8.3%) unmarried opposite-sex partnerships, and 2 (0.7%) same-sex married couples or partnerships. 71 households (24.6%) were one person and 33 (11.4%) had someone living alone who was 65 or older. The average household size was 2.43.  There were 200 families (69.2% of households); the average family size was 2.82.

The age distribution was 154 people (21.9%) under the age of 18, 51 people (7.3%) aged 18 to 24, 152 people (21.7%) aged 25 to 44, 224 people (31.9%) aged 45 to 64, and 121 people (17.2%) who were 65 or older.  The median age was 44.3 years. For every 100 females, there were 97.7 males.  For every 100 females age 18 and over, there were 95.7 males.

There were 345 housing units at an average density of 103.9 per square mile, of the occupied units 181 (62.6%) were owner-occupied and 108 (37.4%) were rented. The homeowner vacancy rate was 5.2%; the rental vacancy rate was 15.0%.  414 people (59.0% of the population) lived in owner-occupied housing units and 288 people (41.0%) lived in rental housing units.

Politics

References

Census-designated places in Lassen County, California
Census-designated places in California